John Woodworth Wilce (May 12, 1888 – May 17, 1963) was an American football player and coach, physician, and university professor.  He served as the head football coach at Ohio State University from 1913 to 1928, compiling a record of 78–33–9.  Wilce is best known for coaching the great Chic Harley and leading Ohio State to their first win over archrival Michigan in 1919. He was inducted into the College Football Hall of Fame as a coach in 1954.

Early years and playing career
Wilce was born in Rochester, New York. He lettered in three sports while attending the University of Wisconsin.  In football, Wilce was an all-conference fullback and captain of the 1909 team.

Coaching career
Following his graduation from Wisconsin, Wilce coached high school football in La Crosse, Wisconsin and then became both an assistant football coach and assistant professor of physical education at Wisconsin.

In 1913, Ohio State began play in the Western Conference, later the Big Ten Conference, and hired Wilce as its head football coach. Wilce's teams won a conference championship in 1916 with a 7–0 record, and repeated in 1917 (8–0–1) and in 1920 (7–1) when Ohio State played its first bowl game, losing the 1921 Rose Bowl to California, 28–0.  Wilce coached the Ohio State Buckeyes football team for sixteen seasons, the second longest tenure in school history after Woody Hayes, compiling a career record of 78–33–9.

Medical and academic career

In 1919, Wilce received his medical degree.  He retired from football after the 1928 season to practice medicine.  Wilce completed postgraduate training in cardiology at University of Edinburgh in the 1930s and was a professor of preventive medicine at The Ohio State University College of Medicine, specializing in research and treatment of heart disease.  He also served as Director of Student Health Services from 1934 to 1958. The John W. Wilce Student Health Center, built in 1969, is named for Wilce.

Wilce's "combination of medicine and football" and a sense of propriety that reflected his English heritage led him to try to reform the speech of his players on and off the field.  He coined the phrase "intestinal fortitude." Haber (1955) records the story of the coinage, the idea first coming to Wilce on the way to a lecture he was to present on anatomy and physiology at Ohio State in 1916, his first use of the phrase in public in a lecture to his team, and how he began to hear the phrase used by others.

Honors and death
In 1954, Wilce was selected for enshrinement in the College Football Hall of Fame and was elected a member of the Ohio State Varsity O Hall of Fame in 1977.  His academic honors include the Ohio State Distinguished Service Award in 1956.  He died of complications of cardiovascular disease on May 17, 1963, in the Columbus suburb of Westerville, Ohio.

Of his departure from coaching he was quoted: "Football was becoming too much of a business. The game was being taken away from the boys.  I was a faculty-type coach who believed educational aspects were more important than winning games."

Family
Wilce was survived by his wife, Minerva Connor Wilce, sons Jay and James M. "Jim" Wilce (1922–1988), and daughters Roseanne Wilce Pearcy and Dorothy Wilce Krause, along with many grandchildren, amongst whom are the nationally known sports and outdoors photographer Anne Krause (1952–2006) and James M. "Jim" Wilce, Jr., a linguistic anthropologist at Northern Arizona University.

Head coaching record

References

Sources
Haber, Tom Burns; "The Origin of 'Intestinal Fortitude.' American Speech 30(3):235-237.
Park, Jack; The Official OHIO STATE Football Encyclopedia (2002), Sports Publishing L.L.C.,

External links
 
 

1888 births
1963 deaths
American football fullbacks
Ohio State Buckeyes football coaches
Wisconsin Badgers football coaches
Wisconsin Badgers football players
High school football coaches in Wisconsin
College Football Hall of Fame inductees
Sportspeople from Rochester, New York